Fernando Hernán Espinoza Cárcamo (born 16 May 1991) is a Chilean former footballer who played as midfielder.

Career
Espinoza started his career playing at youth level for his hometown club CD Huachipato. He joined the club in 2006, and during his time at their youth academy was regarded as one of their most promising players. After making five league appearances for Huachipato, he signed for Moldovan National Division club FC Milsami-Ursidos in 2011. After two seasons in Moldova, he returned to Huachipato in 2013. The following season, he played by Union San Felipe by a year, days after the termination of his contract, his football career would be truncated due to a serious traffic accident which survives, but because of the gravity of its fractures, you will not be able to play more football.

References

External links
 

1991 births
Living people
People from Talcahuano
Chilean footballers
Chilean expatriate footballers
Chile youth international footballers
Chilean Primera División players
C.D. Huachipato footballers
Moldovan Super Liga players
FC Milsami Orhei players
Primera B de Chile players
Unión San Felipe footballers
Expatriate footballers in Moldova
Chilean expatriate sportspeople in Moldova
Association football midfielders